Prokupac is a red Serbian wine grape that is often used to produce darkly colored rosé. The grape is noted for the high sugar levels it can achieve prior to harvest and the high levels of alcohol it can produce following fermentation.

The reasons why Prokupac is widespread grape in Serbia include:

 resistance to low temperatures
 not requiring much care
 giving abundant harvest even on skeletal soil and
 having high sugar content

Synonyms
Prokupac is also known under the synonyms Crnka, Darchin, Kamenicarka, Kamenilarka, Kamenitscharka, Majski Cornii, Negotinsko Crno, Nichevka, Nikodimka, Nisevka, Procoupatz, Procupac, Prokoupatz, Prokupats, Prokupatz, Prokupec, Prokupka, Rekavac, Rekovacka Crnka, Rskavac, Rskavats, Rskavaty, Scopsko Cherno, Skopsko Crno, Skopsko Tsrno, Tsrnina, Zachinok, Zaichin, Zarchin, Zarcin, Zartchin, Zartchine.

References

Sources

External links 

Prokupac online

Red wine grape varieties
Grape varieties of Serbia

it:Prokupac